Duane Charles Theiss (born November 20, 1953) is a former Major League Baseball pitcher. He played two seasons with the Atlanta Braves from 1977 to 1978.

Theiss attended Sheridan High School (Thornville, Ohio) then Marietta College, and in 1974 he played collegiate summer baseball with the Wareham Gatemen of the Cape Cod Baseball League. He was drafted in the 12th round of the 1975 MLB Draft by the Braves.

References

External links

Atlanta Braves players
1953 births
Living people
Baseball players from Ohio
Sportspeople from Zanesville, Ohio
Marietta Pioneers baseball players
Major League Baseball pitchers
Greenwood Braves players
Savannah Braves players
Richmond Braves players
Anderson Braves players
Durham Bulls players
Wareham Gatemen players